Raphael Matthew Bob-Waksberg (born August 17, 1984) is an American comedian, writer, producer, actor, and voice actor. He is known as the creator and showrunner of the Netflix animated comedy series BoJack Horseman and the Amazon Prime Video animated series Undone. He is also an executive producer on the Netflix/Adult Swim animated series Tuca & Bertie, created by BoJack Horseman production designer Lisa Hanawalt.

Early life
Bob-Waksberg was raised in Palo Alto, California with his two sisters, Becky and Amalia.

His family is deeply involved in the Jewish community, and Bob-Waksberg was raised Jewish. From 1982 to about 2010, his mother and grandmother ran a Judaica gift and book store titled Bob & Bob Fine Jewish Gifts and Books.  His father, David Waksberg, helped Russian-speaking Jews emigrate to the United States, and is the CEO of Jewish LearningWorks, a San Francisco-based religious education center. His father has stated, "When a friend asked me about [BoJack Horseman] after the first season, I said it was about teshuvah." When asked how his culture has influenced his art, Bob-Waksberg replied, "Asking me that question is like asking a fish how much being in water has affected it." He has implied that his family perceived comedy as a viable career path, stating in a Times of Israel interview,Humor was a big part of my childhood. My family was full of comedians. We’d sit around the dinner table and try to one-up each other. It sometimes ended in tears, but usually in laughter...There was a warm and encouraging environment at home. My self-loathing and neuroticism are not because of my upbringing.At 9 years of age, he was nicknamed "Raizin," and insisted on the name until the age of 22. 

He grew up 8 minutes away from Lisa Hanawalt, art collaborator and close friend. He was in the grade below hers at Gunn High School, which Bob-Waksberg described as "one of those schools where if you didn’t take five AP classes and get 1600 on your SATs, you were considered subpar."

In 2019, Bob-Waksberg lamented that his high school class voted him "Class Clown" rather than "Funniest." When asked about the difference, he explained, "'Class Clown' is like, 'Ahhhhh, look at me, look at me!' Whereas ‘Funniest’ is like, 'Oh, a subtle wit.'" In a different interview, he stated, "I had ADD as a kid and often acted as the class clown. My teachers used to tell my mom, 'Raphael thinks he’s a real comedian.'"

After high school, Bob-Waksberg attended Bard College in New York for playwriting. For 3 years, presumably during college, he was a roommate of Adam Conover, creator and host of Adam Ruins Everything. Conover and Bob-Waksberg were founding members of the sketch comedy group Olde English. Bob-Waksberg graduated with a degree in Theater and Performance in 2006.

Growing up, he was influenced by shows like The Simpsons, Seinfeld, and The Larry Sanders Show, stating,I was very moved by shows that combined things that were funny and sad. I remember liking Simpsons episodes in which emotions were central. And I thought family sitcoms like Full House, Growing Pains and Family Ties [the models for fictional sitcom "Horsin’ Around" in BoJack] were actually kind of powerful. There was something wonderful about their cheesiness and warmth.Hanawalt's art, specifically her animal-human hybrid characters, inspired him to create BoJack Horseman, and she eventually became the show's production designer and producer.

Career
Bob-Waksberg is well known for creating 2014-2020 animated series BoJack Horseman and performs voices for various characters on the show. 

As a member of the Olde English comedy troupe, he co-wrote and appeared in The Exquisite Corpse Project. He was the script doctor for The Lego Movie 2: The Second Part, which was released on February 8, 2019.

Bob-Waksberg's short story collection titled Someone Who Will Love You in All Your Damaged Glory: Stories was published by Knopf Publishing on June 11, 2019.

In March 2018, it was announced that he was co-creating an animated series for Amazon with Kate Purdy, which would be called Undone. The show revolves around Alma, a Mexican American woman who discovers a "new relationship with time" after a near-fatal car crash and uses this to learn more about the truth behind her father's death. It premiered on September 13, 2019, on Amazon Prime Video. In November 2019, the show was renewed for a second season.

Television

References

External links
 
 The Creator of 'Bojack Horseman' on Why Political Correctness Isn't Censorship by Patrick Marlborough, August 10, 2017, VICE
 NPR 'Fresh Air' radio interview with Terry Gross, Oct. 17, 2018

1984 births
21st-century American male actors
American male comedians
American male television actors
American male voice actors
American television producers
American television writers
Bard College alumni
Jewish American male comedians
Jewish American male actors
Jewish American writers
Living people
American male television writers
21st-century American comedians
21st-century American screenwriters
21st-century American male writers
21st-century American Jews
Jewish American television producers